Clapham Common is a large triangular urban park in Clapham, south London, England. Originally common land for the parishes of Battersea and Clapham, it was converted to parkland under the terms of the Metropolitan Commons Act 1878. It is overlooked by large Georgian and Victorian mansions and nearby Clapham Old Town.

Holy Trinity Clapham, an 18th-century Georgian church overlooking the park, is important in the history of the evangelical Clapham Sect. Half of the park is within the London Borough of Wandsworth, and the other half is within the London Borough of Lambeth.

History 

Originally common land for the parishes of Battersea and Clapham, William Hewer was among the early Londoners to build adjacent to it. Samuel Pepys, the diarist, died at Hewer's house in 1703. The land had been used for cricket in 1700 and was drained in the 1760s, and from the 1790s onwards fine houses were built around the common as fashionable dwellings for wealthy business people in what was then a village detached from metropolitan London. Some later residents were members of the Clapham Sect of evangelical reformers, including Lord Teignmouth and Henry Thornton, the banker and abolitionist.

In the early 1770s, during his stay in London representing America in affairs of the state, Benjamin Franklin had written a paper explaining how he used the ponds for science experiments, and developing a "magic" trick. While traveling on a ship, Franklin had observed that the wake of a ship was diminished when the cooks scuttled their greasy water. He studied the effects at Clapham Common on a large pond there. "I fetched out a cruet of oil and dropt a little of it on the water ... though not more than a teaspoon full, produced an instant calm over a space of several yards square." He later used the trick to "calm the waters" by carrying "a little oil in the hollow joint of my cane."

J. M. W. Turner painted "View on Clapham Common" between 1800 and 1805, showing that even though the common had been drained, it still remained "quite a wild place".

The common was converted to parkland under the terms of the Metropolitan Commons Act in 1878. As London expanded in the 19th century, Clapham was absorbed into the capital, with most of the remaining palatial or agricultural estates replaced with terraced housing by the early 1900s.

In 1911, Scottish evangelist and teacher Oswald Chambers founded and was principal of the Bible Training College in Clapham Common, an "embarrassingly elegant" property situated at 45 North Side that had been purchased by the Pentecostal League of Prayer.

During World War II, storage bunkers were built on the Battersea Rise side of the common; two mounds remain.

Governance 
Half of the common is within the London Borough of Wandsworth and half within the London Borough of Lambeth. It is wholly managed and maintained by the London Borough of Lambeth, while the policing of the open space is divided between the Wandsworth and Lambeth borough "commands" of the Metropolitan Police, which follow the local government boundaries. The roads surrounding the common fall within the SW4, SW11 and SW12 postcodes.

Local government elections 
Clapham Common is in the Clapham Common electoral ward.

In 2010, residents of the Clapham Common ward elected two Conservative Councillors & one Lib Dem Councillor.

In 2014, residents of the Clapham Common ward elected 3 Conservative Councillors.
This was the first time the Conservatives had taken control of the Clapham Common ward since the 1960s.

In 2018, residents elected 2 Labour & 1 Conservative councillor.

In 2022, after boundary changes, residents elected 1 Liberal Democrat & 1 Labour councillor.

Amenities 
Clapham Common has a range of sporting facilities, including a running track, bowling green, cricket, football, rugby and Australian rules football pitches, and a skateboard venue. The park contains three ponds, two of which are historical features, and a more modern paddling pool known as Cock Pond. Eagle Pond and Mount Pond are used for angling and contain a variety of species including carp to 20 lb, roach, tench and bream. Eagle Pond was extensively refurbished in 2002 when it was completely drained, landscaped and replanted to provide a better habitat for the fish it contained. Long Pond has a century-old tradition of use for model boating.

Holy Trinity Church (1776) is close to the north side of the park. An Anglican church, it hosts its fete in the park every summer.

Clapham Common and Clapham South Underground stations are on the edge of the common at its easternmost and southernmost points respectively. Both stations are served by the Northern line.

A memorial tree to actor Jeremy Brett – who had lived locally for many years prior to his death in 1995 – was planted on 30 March 2007.

The bandstand 

In the centre of the park is a bandstand constructed in 1890. It is the largest bandstand in London and a Grade II Listed Building. For many years it was also erroneously thought to be one of the bandstands first erected in 1861 in the Royal Horticultural Society's gardens in South Kensington, which would have made it the oldest surviving cast iron bandstand in Europe. However, recent research has shown that these bandstands went to Southwark Park and Peckham Rye, and it appears that the Clapham bandstand was fabricated to a very similar design almost thirty years later.

The bandstand's maintenance had been neglected by Lambeth Council for thirty years, and by 2001 it was thought to be in danger of collapse and had to be shored up with scaffolding for five years. In 2005–2006, a full restoration of the bandstand and surrounding landscape took place, partly funded by an £895,000 lottery grant from the Heritage Lottery Fund matched by £300,000 from Lambeth Council and a further £100,000 from local fundraising efforts and the proceeds of the Ben and Jerry's Summer Sundae event held on the Common. The drainage bund around the bandstand was restored with granite setts during the summer of 2011 at a cost of £12,000 to resolve design faults in the earlier works.

Cruising 

Clapham Common has a reputation as a place for men seeking anonymous sex with other men in public places. When Welsh politician Ron Davies was robbed at knifepoint in 1998 after he gave a lift to strangers he had met in the park, there was speculation that the incident involved "cruising"; Davies resigned his position in the UK government, denying the incident had anything to do with drugs or sex. There have been several attacks on men in the vicinity of the park, including one in 2005 on a young man, Jody Dobrowski, thought by his attackers to be gay, during which he was badly beaten and later died. The incident was the impetus for the making of the 2007 Channel 4 film Clapham Junction.

Events 

The park has hosted various musical festivals, including Colourscape Music Festival since 1989,; Get Loaded in the Park, from 2004 to 2011 when Razorlight were the headline act; South West Four Eurodance music festival annually in August since 2004; and other music events, such as Subway Picnic Rocks in 2008, organised by Action Against Hunger In 2014 the Calling Festival, which had previously been held in Hyde Park under the name Hard Rock Calling Festival, moved to Clapham Common; headline acts are Aerosmith and Stevie Wonder.

Sporting events held in Clapham Common and sports teams based in the park include the Latin American football League, which has played organised football on the red car pitches located on the south side of the park since the 1980s; the British Australian Rules Football League Grand Final, for which the park is the traditional venue; South West London Chargers rugby club formed in 2013 have their home in the park; London Titans football club play in the park; various sport teams are active on the park, including softball, korfball, and Australian Rules Football. Clapham Alexandra football club play some games on the park. In 2010 Sunday League footballers using the facilities in the park felt they were "awful". In 2021 Foot Locker, in partnership with the NBA, completed the refurbishment of the Clapham Common Basketball Court.

A Lesbian & Gay Pride event, to be termed Pride House, was planned to take place on the park during the 2012 Summer Olympics, but ran into opposition from the Friends of Clapham Common and was eventually cancelled for lack of funding. Every Easter and February half-term George Irvin's Funfair visits the park.

On 13 March 2021, a vigil was held on the common following the death of Sarah Everard, who was kidnapped nearby.

In popular culture 
Clapham Commonn is featured in "The Adventure of the Clapham Cook", an episode of an Agatha Christie short story dramatized by the BBC.

References

External links 
 Friends of Clapham Common – Voluntary organisation formed in 1998

Clapham
Common land in London
Cricket in Surrey
English cricket in the 14th to 17th centuries
Parks and open spaces in the London Borough of Lambeth
History of the London Borough of Lambeth
Parks and open spaces in the London Borough of Wandsworth